The Moody County Courthouse in Flandreau, South Dakota, United States, was built in 1915.  It was listed on the National Register of Historic Places in 1993.

It is a three-story building clad with brick and sandstone.  Its design is in Classical Revival style with Greek Revival details.  It was designed by Joseph Schwarz and built by contractor O.H. Olsen.

See also
Flandreau Masonic Temple, also NRHP-listed, which was the Old Moody County Courthouse.

References

Courthouses in South Dakota
Neoclassical architecture in South Dakota
Government buildings completed in 1915
National Register of Historic Places in Moody County, South Dakota